Tumbling Shoals is a census-designated place in Cleburne County, Arkansas, United States. Per the 2020 census, the population was 902.

Demographics

2020 census

Note: the US Census treats Hispanic/Latino as an ethnic category. This table excludes Latinos from the racial categories and assigns them to a separate category. Hispanics/Latinos can be of any race.

Education
Almost all of Tumbling Shoals is served by the Heber Springs School District to provide public elementary and secondary education to students; that district leads to graduation from Heber Springs High School.

A small section coincides with the Concord Public Schools.

References

Further reading
 

Census-designated places in Arkansas
Census-designated places in Cleburne County, Arkansas